Weir River is a locality in Census division 23 in Northern Manitoba, Canada,. It lies on the eponymous Weir River.

History
Weir River was founded with the building of the Hudson Bay Railway in the third decade of the 20th century. When the originally intended final section line route north east to Port Nelson was abandoned, the construction of the new route of the final section from Amery ( to the south) north to Churchill, which opened in 1929, led to its founding. Weir River lies on the line between the settlements of Lawledge to the north and Charlebois to the south.

Transportation
Weir River is the site of Weir River railway station, served by the Via Rail Winnipeg–Churchill train. It has a passing loop.

References

Localities in Manitoba
Unincorporated communities in Northern Region, Manitoba